Natural lakes in Bosnia and Herzegovina take , which is a little more than 0.12% of the total surface area of Bosnia and Herzegovina. Buško Blato is the largest lake, its size being 56.7 km2. The total size of all lakes is 1/10 as large as the world average. Because of this, natural lakes in Bosnia and Herzegovina are not economically important.

All the natural lakes of Bosnia and Herzegovina are younger than 9000 years, unlike the other European lakes. This was concluded after the explorations of absolute age of the lake silt. 
It was written in older literature that the mountain lakes of Bosnia and Herzegovina were made because of glacial movements, and the lower altitude lakes of river flows in combination with glaciations, but many other facts were unattended. 
In the mountain parts of Bosnia and Herzegovina animal husbandry had a crucial impact on lakes. Every ranch had its own lake which served as a cattle watering-place. If there were no natural lakes in Bosnia and Herzegovina, then the artificial lakes were made, for example Jugovo Lake at Zelengora mountain.

Unlike the mountain lakes of Bosnia and Herzegovina, Plivsko Lake was made of a natural chemical precipitate of carbonate minerals and forming travertine sediment in the process. The subsistence of these lakes is highly threatened by urbanisation, which began in the 1960s.

Hutovo Blato was made in the valley of the Neretva river and its existence depends on the energy and meliorative attempts in the underflow of Neretva river. Ichthyological research of natural lakes of Bosnia and Herzegovina began in 1924 and that research determined good natural and biological opportunities for the fish farming.

List of lakes

 * Artificial/Natural - Abandoned surface mineshaft subsequently flooded with underground wells;
 * Natural/Artificial - Of natural origin with a subsequent works on regulating the quantity of water and/or increasing depth and/or arranging the environment.

See also

 List of lakes
 List of rivers of Bosnia and Herzegovina

References

External links

Bistro BiH - Anglers web portal of Bosnia and Herzegovina

Bosnia and Herzegovina
Lakes